The 2011 Borough Council of Wellingborough election took place on 5 May 2011 to elect members of Borough Council of Wellingborough in Northamptonshire, UK. This was on the same day as other local elections.

References

2011 English local elections
May 2011 events in the United Kingdom
2015
2010s in Northamptonshire